Flying Dragon Airlines was a Nepalese airline based in Nepalgunj operating domestic services out of Nepalgunj Airport.

History 
The Civil Aviation Authority of Nepal granted Flying Dragon Airlines an air operators certificate in June 2005. The airline was required to be based in Nepalgunj and carry out operations in the Mid- and Far-Western development regions.

Chinese aviation company China Flying Dragon Aviation, based in Harbin, owned 49% of Flying Dragon Airlines. The airline was due to launch in September 2005, using Y-12 17-seater dual passenger/cargo aircraft.

Destinations
Flying Dragon Airlines regularly served the following destinations on passenger or cargo service. These were cancelled either at the closure of operations or before:

Fleet 
At the time of closure, Flying Dragon Airlines operated the following aircraft:

References 

Defunct airlines of Nepal
2005 establishments in Nepal
2006 disestablishments in Nepal